This is a list of the vice-admirals of Connaught,  the province of Connacht in the west of Ireland.

Prior to 1585 the whole of Ireland was served by a single vice-admiral, namely Thomas Radcliffe, 3rd Earl of Sussex (1558–1565), Gerald Fitzgerald, 11th Earl of Kildare (1564–1573) and Thomas Butler, 10th Earl of Ormonde (1585). Separate vice-admiralties were then established for Munster in 1585, for Ulster by 1602, for Leinster by 1612 and for Connaught by 1615.

Vice-admirals of Connaught
Source (1615–1661)

Source (1661 onwards)

 1615–1627 Sir Oliver St John 
 1628–1639 Sir George St George
 no appointment known
 1660 Sir Oliver St George
 1691–1695 Sir Oliver St George, 1st Baronet
 1695–1696 John Eyres (Revoked 1696)
 1696–1735 Sir George St George, 2nd Baronet
 1735–?1741 John Ussher (died 1741)
 1747–?1768 Stratford Eyre
 1768–>1788 Charles Molyneux, 1st Earl of Sefton (died 1794)
 1794– William Molyneux, 2nd Earl of Sefton (died 1838)
 1822– Richard Le Poer Trench, 2nd Earl of Clancarty (died 1837)
 <1841–>1847: Marquess of Clanricarde (died 1874)
 1889– George Bingham, 4th Earl of Lucan (died 1914)

References

Military ranks of the United Kingdom
Vice-Admirals
Connaught